Fazna Ahmed is the current and First Lady of the Maldives. She is married to Ibrahim Mohamed Solih, current President of the Maldives.

References

First ladies of the Maldives
Living people
Year of birth missing (living people)